Menis is both a given name and a surname. Notable people with the name include:

Adán Martín Menis (1943–2010), president of the Canary Islands 
Argentina Menis (1948-2023), Romanian discus thrower
Fernando Menis (born 1951), Spanish architect
Menis Ketchum (born 1943), Justice of the Supreme Court of Appeals of West Virginia, U.S.
Menis Koumandareas (1931–2014), Greek writer